Volvi is a community of the Volvi municipality. Before the 2011 local government reform it was part of the municipality of Rentina, of which it was a municipal district. The 2011 census recorded 1,353 inhabitants in the community. The community of Volvi covers an area of 92.77 km2.

Administrative division
The community of Volvi consists of four separate settlements: 
Megali Volvi (population 123)
Mikra Volvi (population 555)
Rentina (population 504)
Vamvakia (population 171)
The aforementioned population figures are as of 2011.

See also
 List of settlements in the Thessaloniki regional unit

References

Populated places in Thessaloniki (regional unit)